David Charles McGrath (10 November 1872 – 31 July 1934) Australian rules footballer who played with Fitzroy in the Victorian Football League (VFL).

References

External links

 

Fitzroy Football Club players
1872 births
1934 deaths
Australian rules footballers from Victoria (Australia)